The USS Defiant is the name of several starships in the Star Trek media franchise, most notably a vessel featured in Star Trek: Deep Space Nine (1993–1999). Introduced in the show's third season, it is a warship attached to the show's eponymous space station.

The spacecraft was designed by Jim Martin, Gary Hutzel and Tony Meinger.

Design and development
For the first two seasons of Deep Space Nine, stories requiring characters to travel off-station typically involved small runabout vessels. Producer Ira Steven Behr and writer Robert Hewitt Wolfe believed runabouts would be insufficient to confront the adversarial Dominion introduced in the second season, and they convinced executive producer Rick Berman of the need for a new ship. Additionally, the Defiant was intended to solve the problem of cramped runabout sets.

The Defiant was initially designed by art illustrator Jim Martin, with contributions from visual effects supervisor Gary Hutzel and modelmaker Tony Meininger. Original designs called for a "beefed-up" runabout-type ship, but this gave way to a full-fledged starship design initially called Valiant. This name was dropped out of fear that it would conflict with Star Trek: Voyager's titular starship, also beginning with a "V".

An early screenplay for Star Trek: First Contact (1996) called for the Defiant to be destroyed, but Behr objected and the idea was dropped.

Following the Defiant's destruction in "The Changing Face of Evil", the writers had wanted a new type of successor ship but the budget wasn't available. As a result, they replaced the Defiant with the same spacecraft design for the USS Sao Paulo in "The Dogs of War". Ron Moore said in the Star Trek: Deep Space Nine Companion that the new ship was intended to be designated "Defiant-A", but it would have been too costly to redo the CG model for one episode because stock shots from earlier episodes had to be used as well for budgetary reasons.

Depiction
Benjamin Sisko helped design the Defiant, which was conceived as a prototype vessel to counter the Borg. Sisko receives command of the Defiant in 2370 to make contact with the Dominion in the show's third-season premier. Unlike most Starfleet ships, the Defiant is built for combat rather than science and exploration. The Defiant remains attached to Deep Space Nine under Sisko's command for the remainder of the series, carrying the crew on missions beyond the space station. It appears briefly in Star Trek: First Contact under the command of Worf. The Breen destroy the Defiant during the show's finale arc. Starfleet gives Sisko command of a new ship of the same class, the USS Sao Paulo, which he renames Defiant.

The Defiant also appears in numerous spin-off books, comics, and video games.

Reception
The USS Defiant is noted as a powerful spacecraft vessel of the Star Trek science fiction universe in the late 24th century. CBR compared the maneuverable and powerful Defiant to the Millennium Falcon. Space.com also noted the Defiant as one of the more agile science fiction spacecraft, compared to some of the slower, almost-nautical movement of larger spacecraft of Star Trek.

The moment when Sisko decloaks the Defiant spacecraft for the first time in "The Search" was rated by Geek.com in 2015 as one of the top 35 moments in Star Trek; they said it marked a "great start" to the third season of Deep Space Nine. The addition of the Defiant helped the show dig deeper into stories set in the Gamma Quadrant, as well as the long war-saga arc of the show's later seasons.

A miniature model of the USS Defiant sold for 106,000 USD in 2006 at auction.

References

Further reading 

 Star Trek: Deep Space 9 and the U. S. S Defiant Illustrated Handbook, Eaglemoss Publications Limited, Jan 12, 2021. 192 pages.

External links

Defiant
Star Trek: Deep Space Nine
Fictional elements introduced in 1994
Fictional military vehicles